This is a list of Polish divisions in World War II.

Polish divisions in September 1939 Campaign
 1st Legions Infantry Division of Józef Piłsudski (stationed in Wilno) - Brig. Gen. Wincenty Kowalski
 2nd Legions Infantry Division (stationed in Kielce) - Col. Edward Dojan-Surówka, after September 8, 1939 col. Antoni Staich
 3rd Legions Infantry Division (stationed in Zamość) - Col. Marian Turowski
 4th Toruń Infantry Division (stationed in Toruń) - Col. Tadeusz Lubicz-Niezabitowski, after September 4, 1939 Col. Mieczysław Rawicz-Mysłowski, after September 12 Col. Józef Werobej
 5th Lwów Infantry Division (stationed in Lwów) - Gen. Juliusz Zulauf
 6th Kraków Infantry Division (stationed in Kraków) - Gen. Bernard Mond
 7th Częstochowa Infantry Division (stationed in Częstochowa) - Brig. Gen. Janusz Gąsiorowski
 8th Infantry Division (stationed in Modlin) - Col. Tadeusz Wyrwa-Furgalski
 9th Siedlce Infantry Division (stationed in Siedlce) - Col. Józef Werobej
 10th Łódź Infantry Division (stationed in Łódź) -Gen. Franciszek Dindorf-Ankowicz
 11th Carpathian Infantry Division (stationed in Stanisławów) - Col. Bronisław Prugar-Ketling
 12th Tarnopol Infantry Division (stationed in Tarnopol) - Gen. Gustaw Paszkiewicz
 13th Kresy Infantry Division (stationed in Równe) - Col. Władysław Zubosz-Kaliński
 14th Greater Poland Infantry Division (stationed in Poznań) - Gen. Franciszek Wład
 15th Greater Poland Infantry Division (stationed in Bydgoszcz) - Gen. Wacław Przyjałkowski
 16th Pomeranian Infantry Division (stationed in Grudziądz) - Col. Stanisław Świtalski, after September 2, 1939 Col. Zygmunt Bohusz-Szyszko
 17th Greater Poland Infantry Division (stationed in Gniezno) - Col. Mieczysław Stanisław Mozdyniewicz
 18th Łomża Infantry Division (stationed in Łomża) - Col. Stefan Kossecki
 19th Infantry Division (stationed in Wilno) - Gen. Józef Kwaciszewski
 20th Infantry Division (stationed in Baranowicze) - Col. Wilhelm Liszka-Lawicz
 21st Mountain Infantry Division (Poland) (stationed in Bielsko-Biała) - Gen. Józef Kustroń
 22nd Mountain Infantry Division (Poland) (stationed in Przemyśl) - Col. Leopold Engel-Ragis
 23rd Upper Silesian Infantry Division (stationed in Katowice) - Col. Władysław Powierza
 24th Jarosław Infantry Division (stationed in Jarosław) - Col. Aleksander Krzyżanowski, after September 8, 1939 Col. Bolesław Schwarzenberg-Czerny
 25th Kalisz Infantry Division (stationed in Kalisz) - Gen. Franciszek Alter
 26th Skierniewice Infantry Division (stationed in Skierniewice) - Col. Adam Brzechwa-Ajdukiewicz
 27th Kowel Infantry Division (stationed in Kowel) - Gen. Juliusz Drapella
 28th Warsaw Infantry Division (stationed in Warsaw) - Gen. Władysław Bończa-Uzdowski
 29th Grodno Infantry Division (stationed in Grodno) - Col. Ignacy Oziewicz
 30th Polesie Infantry Division (stationed in Kobryń) - Gen. Leopold Cehak
 33rd Reserve Infantry Division (stationed in Grodno) - Col. Tadeusz Kalina-Zieleniewski
 35th Reserve Infantry Division (stationed in Wilno) - Col. Jarosław Szafran
 36th Reserve Infantry Division (stationed in Czortków) - Col. Michał Ostrowski
 38th Reserve Infantry Division (stationed in Łuniniec) - Col. Alojzy Wir-Konas
 39th Reserve Infantry Division (stationed in Rembertów) - Gen. Bruno Olbrycht
 41st Reserve Infantry Division (stationed in Ostrów Mazowiecka) - Gen. Wacław Piekarski
 44th Reserve Infantry Division (stationed in Łowicz) - Col. Eugeniusz Żongołłowicz
 45th Reserve Infantry Division (stationed in Kraków) - Gen. Henryk Krok-Paszkowski
 50th Infantry Division „Brzoza” - Col. Ottokar Brzoza-Brzezina
 55th Reserve Infantry Division (stationed in Będzin) - Col. Stanisław Kalabiński
 60th Infantry Division 'Kobryń' - Col. Adam Epler
 Polish Cavalry Division 'Zaza' - Brig. Gen. Zygmunt Podhorski

Polish divisions in France 1939–40 

 1st Grenadier Division - Gen. Bronisław Duch
 2nd Rifle Division - Gen. Bronisław Prugar-Ketling
 3rd Infantry Division - Gen. Rudolf Dreszer
 4th Infantry Division (Poland) - Col. Tadeusz Kalina-Zieleniewski
 Polish Independent Highland Brigade - Gen. Zygmunt Bohusz-Szyszko
 10th Armoured Cavalry Brigade (10éme Brigade de cavalerie motorisée) - Gen. Stanisław Maczek
 Polish Independent Carpathian Rifle Brigade - Gen. Stanisław Kopański

Polish divisions & brigades on the Western and Italian Fronts 
 I Corps
 1st Armoured Division
 1st Independent Parachute Brigade
 II Corps
 3rd Carpathian Rifle Division
 5th Kresowa Infantry Division
 2nd Armoured Brigade

Polish divisions on the Eastern Fronts 
 First Polish Army
1st Tadeusz Kościuszko Infantry Division
 2nd Infantry Division
 3rd Infantry Division
 4th Infantry Division
 6th Infantry Division
 1st Armoured Brigade "Westerplatte Heroes"
 1st Warsaw Cavalry Brigade
 in addition:
 Army artillery: 5 Artillery Brigades (1-5), 1st AA-Artillery Division, 1st mortar regiment 
 1st Engineering Brigade 
 4th independent heavy tank regiment 
 13th SP-artillery regiment (SU-85 and ISU-152)
 Second Army (Poland)
 5th Infantry Division
 7th Infantry Division
 8th Infantry Division
 9th Infantry Division
 10th Infantry Division 
 16th Armoured Brigade, 
 2nd Artillery Division, 3rd AA-artillery Division, 3rd indep. mortar regiment 
 3 AT-artillery brigades (nos.9,11,14) 
 2nd Sapper Brigade 
 4th independent heavy tank regiment 
 28th SP-artillery regiment (21 x SU-85)
1st Armoured Corps: 3 armoured brigades, 1st Motorized Infantry Brigade - details below. Subordinated to the 2nd Army. 
 1st Motorized Infantry Brigade (Polish)(East) 
 2nd Armoured Brigade (2. Brygada Pancerna) - (65 x T-34/85) 
 3rd Armoured Brigade 
 4th Armoured Brigade 
 24th SP-artillery regiment (21 x SU-85) 
 25th SP-artillery regiment (21 x ISU-122) 
 27th SP-artillery regiment (21 x SU-76M) 
 2nd mortar regiment 
 26th AA-artillery regiment 
 Rocket artillery battalion

Polish divisions of the underground armies 
 Home Army - brigade or division-sized units only
 2nd Home Army Infantry Division (Poland) (Kielce-Radom)
 Polish 8th Home Army Infantry Division (Warsaw Uprising)
 19th Home Army Infantry Division (Poland) (Wilno)
 27th Home Army Infantry Division (Poland) (Wołyń)
 Cracovian Home Army Infantry Division
 Cracovian Home Army Cavalry Brigade
 National Armed Forces

See also

 Polish contribution to World War II
 History of Poland (1939–1945)

Lists of military units and formations of World War II
 
Divisions, World War II
Polish, World War II